The GMHC (formerly Gay Men's Health Crisis) is a New York City–based non-profit, volunteer-supported and community-based AIDS service organization whose mission statement is to "end the AIDS epidemic and uplift the lives of all affected."

History

1980s
The organization was founded in January 1982 after reports began surfacing in San Francisco and New York City that a rare form of cancer called Kaposi's sarcoma was affecting young gay men. After the Centers for Disease Control declared the new disease an epidemic, Gay Men's Health Crisis was created when 80 men gathered in New York writer Larry Kramer's apartment to discuss the issue of "gay cancer" and to raise money for research. GMHC took its name from the fact that the earliest men who fell victim to AIDS in the early 1980s were gay. The first meeting was held in Church of St. Joseph in Greenwich Village.

The founders were Nathan Fain, Larry Kramer, Lawrence D. Mass, Paul Popham, Paul Rapoport and Edmund White.  They organized the formal, tax-exempt entity, which was incorporated on June 30, 1982.  At the time it was the largest volunteer AIDS organization in the world. Paul Popham was chosen as the president.

Rodger McFarlane began a crisis counseling hotline that originated on his own home telephone, which ultimately became one of the organization's most effective tools for sharing information about AIDS. He was named as the director of GMHC in 1982, helping create a more formal structure for the nascent organization, which had no funding or offices when he took on the role. GMHC operated out of a couple of rooms for offices in a rooming house at 318 West 22nd Street in Chelsea owned by Mel Cheren of West End Records.

Larry Kramer wrote that by the time of McFarlane's death, "the GMHC is essentially what he started: crisis counseling, legal aid, volunteers, the buddy system, social workers" as part of an organization that serves more than 15,000 people affected by HIV and AIDS. In an interview with The New York Times after McFarlane's death in May 2009, Kramer described how "single-handedly Rodger took this struggling ragtag group of really frightened and mostly young men, found us an office and set up all the programs."

Kramer resigned in 1983 due to his many disagreements with the other founders. From that time on his public comments and posture toward GMHC were negative, if not hostile. Kramer's play The Normal Heart is a roman à clef of his involvement with the organization.

On April 30, 1983, the GMHC sponsored the first major fund-raising event for AIDS – a benefit performance of the Ringling Bros. and Barnum & Bailey Circus.

By 1984, the Centers for Disease Control had requested GMHC's assistance in planning public conferences on AIDS.  That same year, the human immunodeficiency virus was discovered by the French Drs Françoise Barré-Sinoussi and Luc Montagnier.  Within two years, GMHC was assisting heterosexual men and women (see Dennis Levy), hemophiliacs, intravenous drug users, and children.

From 1987 until his death from AIDS in 1989, Doctor Barry Gingell served as a medical director for the Gay Men's Health Crisis.

Gay Men's Health Crisis received extensive coverage in Randy Shilts's 1987 book And the Band Played On.  The book described the progress of the pandemic, blaming the government, especially the Reagan administration and Secretary of Health Margaret Heckler, for failing to respond.  It praised GMHC for its work. Shilts was a gay man who later died of AIDS.

1990s
In 1997 the organization moved into headquarters at the nine-story Tisch Building at 119 West 24 Street in the Chelsea neighborhood.  The building underwent a $12.5 million renovation.  It is named for Preston Robert Tisch and Joan Tisch.  The couple donated $3.5 million for the project and Joan is on the GMHC board of directors.

In the 1990s a fundraising event on the Atlantic Ocean beach at Fire Island Pines, New York evolved into a major circuit party and developed a reputation for being connected with unsafe sex and recreational drug use.  GMHC pulled the plug after the 1998 fundraiser after one man died on Fire Island of an overdose of the drug gamma hydroxy butyrate (GHB) the evening before the party and 21 revelers were arrested for drug possession.

2000s
GMHC has received multiple grants from the Carnegie Corporation, an organization that has supported more than 550 New York City arts and social service institutions since its inception in 2002, and which was made possible through a donation by New York City mayor Michael Bloomberg (along with 406 other arts and social service institutions).

GMHC expanded its wide range of services for over 100,000 New Yorkers affected by HIV/AIDS. These services include health and nutrition education, legal, housing and mental health support, vocational training and case management. With a new state-of-the-art kitchen and larger dining room, free hot meals will be served to more clients. The Keith Haring Food Pantry Program will increase its capacity to provide grocery bags and nutrition counseling to more people in need.

During GMHC’s move into their new building they were met with discrimination from prospective landlords. Many did not understand what GMHC was and how they offered services to the community and those sick with HIV/AIDS. Even when GMHC found a place to live there were several restrictions placed upon by the landlord. A major one was that GMHC couldn’t perform any sort of medical procedures on the premises. This forced the GMHC clinic to not move along with the rest of GMHC.

The new location enabled GMHC to expand its services to meet the growing and complex needs of people affected by HIV/AIDS. In this 39th year of the epidemic, HIV continues to rise at alarming rates – locally and nationally – particularly among women, African Americans, Latinos and men who have sex with men.

The HIV prevention and testing programs expanded in the new GMHC Center for HIV Prevention at 224 West 29th Street in NYC which will include a new youth leadership-development program.  In 2019, GMHC's Testing Center moved to 307 West 38th Street where the offices are located as of 2018..  In order to keep up with the COVID-19 global pandemic GMHC has begun offering HIV testing at home to make sure people are sticking to social distance guidelines. They have also closed their usual testing site and created an offsite location for continuing testing. The test results can take anywhere from 2–20 minutes for people to get an answer. While GMHC cannot give out HIV medications such as PrEP or PEP they can help people find options at a lower cost once they have a prescription.

In 2015 Larry Kramer was reunited with GMHC almost thirty years after he was removed from the organization. Even after years of criticism from Kramer about many of the choices made by GMHC, Kelsey Louie, a member of GMHC reached out to Kramer. After several meetings between Kelsey and Kramer a peace offering seemed to have been reached. Kramer was invited to GMHC’s gala as a special guest and presented with their first ever lifetime achievement award. Kramer held no ill will towards the organization and was happy to be invited back. Since his first appearance, Kramer continued to attend GMHC events and had even been invited to speak at GMHC staff meetings before his death in May 2020.

References

External links
 GMHC — official website
 Gay Men's Health Crisis records, 1975–1978, 1982–1999. Manuscripts and Archives, New York Public Library.
 Larry Kramer Papers. Yale Collection of American Literature, Beinecke Rare Book and Manuscript Library.
 Welcome to Our NPIN Community | National Prevention Information Network
 Finding Larry Kramer
 AIDS Agency Gets a New Home, and a Founder’s Ire

Organizations established in 1982
HIV/AIDS organizations in the United States
Gay men's organizations
LGBT health organizations in the United States
1982 in LGBT history
Men's health organizations
Men's organizations in the United States
1982 establishments in New York City
Medical and health organizations based in New York City